Eldo is a given name is a variation of Eldho and may refer to the following people

People
Eldo Abraham, Indian politician
Eldo T. Ridgway (1880–1955), American physician and politician

Fictional characters
Eldo Davip,a fictional soldier from the novel Star Wars: The New Jedi Order: Enemy Lines: Rebel Dream
Grandpa Eldo, a fictional character from the children's book series Elmer the Patchwork Elephant

See also
Yeldos
Eldho